Vlkovce is a village and municipality in Kežmarok District in the Prešov Region of north Slovakia.

History
In historical records the village was first mentioned in 1268.

Geography
The municipality lies at an altitude of 825 metres and covers an area of 3.84 km2 . It has a population of about 445 people.

External links
http://www.statistics.sk/mosmis/eng/run.html

Villages and municipalities in Kežmarok District